Darin Knight is an American sound engineer. He won an Oscar for Best Sound for the film The Deer Hunter.

Selected filmography
 The Deer Hunter (1978)

References

External links

Year of birth missing (living people)
Living people
American audio engineers
Best Sound Mixing Academy Award winners